Shō is the romanization of the Japanese surname . It is derived from the Chinese surname Zhuang (trad. , simp. ).

"Sho", in the United States, had fewer than one hundred bearers during the 1990 census and being ranked 127,046th during the year 2000 census.

People
 Mayumi Shō

References

Japanese-language surnames